Gary Rensing is a retired American soccer defender who played nine seasons in the North American Soccer League and earned four caps with the U.S. national team.

Player

Youth
Rensing attended St. Louis University where he was a member of the men's soccer team from 1967 to 1969.  In 1967, the Billikens shared the national title with the Michigan State Spartans after the game was called after 42 minutes of scoreless overtime for deteriorating weather conditions.  In 1969, the team won the title with a 4–0 victory over the University of San Francisco.

NASL
In 1970, the St Louis Stars of the North American Soccer League (NASL) signed Rensing out of college.  He went on to play eight seasons with the Stars before the team folded at the end of the 1977 season.  Rensing then moved to the Chicago Sting for the 1978 season.  Rensing retired at the end of the 1978 season.

National team
Rensing earned four caps, all of them World Cup qualifiers, in 1972.  The U.S. went 0-3-1 and failed to qualify for the cup finals.  While Rensing played all four games, he never played an entire game.  He came off for Larry Hausmann in the August 20, 1972 loss to Canada, his first with the national team and he came on for Walner Mata in the September 10, 1972 loss to Mexico, his last game with the national team.

Coach
Rensing has also coached with Forest Park Community College.

Rensing was inducted into the St. Louis Soccer Hall of Fame in 2001.

References

External links
 NASL stats

1947 births
Living people
American soccer coaches
American soccer players
Chicago Sting (NASL) players
North American Soccer League (1968–1984) players
Saint Louis Billikens men's soccer players
Soccer players from St. Louis
St. Louis Stars (soccer) players
United States men's international soccer players
Association football defenders